Ellen Marchien Dubbeldam-Kuipers (born 8 April 1971 in Hattem, Gelderland) is a former field hockey forward from the Netherlands, who played a total number of 94 international matches for the Dutch National Women's Team, in which she scored 32 goals. She made her debut on 17 June 1994 in a friendly against Germany, and won the bronze medal at the 1996 Summer Olympics. Kuipers retired from international competition after the 1998 World Cup in Utrecht. Post retirement, her interests lie in branding and interior design.

References

External links
 
 Dutch Hockey Federation

1971 births
Living people
People from Hattem
Field hockey players at the 1996 Summer Olympics
Dutch female field hockey players
Olympic field hockey players of the Netherlands
Olympic bronze medalists for the Netherlands
Olympic medalists in field hockey
Medalists at the 1996 Summer Olympics
SV Kampong players
20th-century Dutch women
21st-century Dutch women
Sportspeople from Gelderland